IEF may refer to:

 Index of Economic Freedom
 Integrated Education Fund (Northern Ireland)
 International Energy Forum
 Isoelectric focusing
 Islamic Enlightenment Foundation
 International e-Sports Festival